Gallup may refer to:

Gallup, Inc., a firm founded by George Gallup, well known for its opinion poll
Gallup (surname), a surname
Gallup, New Mexico, a city in New Mexico, United States
Gallup station, an Amtrak train in downtown Gallup, New Mexico
Gallup International Association, a group of polling organizations registered in Zurich, Switzerland
USS Gallup, various ships of the United States Navy
Gallup Korea, a South Korean research company founded by Park Moo-ik

See also
Gallop (disambiguation)
Gallup & Robinson, a marketing research company
George H. Gallup House, a historic house in Jefferson, Iowa, United States